Jakub Lofek (born 3 December 2005) is a Polish figure skater. He qualified to the final segment at the 2022 World Junior Championships and the 2023 World Junior Championships.

Career 
Jakub Lofek began learning to skate as a five-year-old. He is coached by his mother, Ewa Lofek.

He made his ISU Junior Grand Prix (JGP) debut in August 2019, placing 16th in Courchevel, France. His best JGP result, seventh, came in August 2021, also in Courchevel.

In the 2021–22 season, Lofek won the Polish national junior title and was nominated to represent his country at the 2022 World Junior Championships in Tallinn, Estonia, where he qualified to the final segment.

In March 2023, he advanced to the free skate at the 2023 World Junior Championships in Calgary, Canada.

Programs

Competitive highlights 
CS: Challenger Series; JGP: Junior Grand Prix

References

External links 
 
 

2005 births
Living people
Polish male single skaters
People from Oświęcim